Separationofpowers (foaled February 9, 2015) is an American Thoroughbred racehorse and the winner of the 2018 Test Stakes.

Career

Separationofpowers's first race was on July 30, 2017, at Saratoga, where she came in first.

In her second race, she competed in the September 2nd, 2017 Grade-1 Spinaway Stakes, but finished in 3rd. She had better luck the next month as on October 8, 2017, she won the Frizette Stakes. This was her final win of the year after a fourth place finish at the 2017 Breeders' Cup Juvenile Fillies.

She had an ankle injury that caused her to miss most of the 2018 season. The break paid off though as she won the August 4th, 2018 Grade-1 Test Stakes upon her return. This was her only win of the 2018 season, after a disappointing fourth place finish at the Grade-1 2018 Cotillion Handicap.

Her 2019 season was limited to only three races, with her only victory being at the Grade-3 Bed O' Roses Invitational Stakes.

Her final race was a fourth place finish at the 2019 Ballerina Stakes.

Separationfopowers was put up for sale in November 2019.

Pedigree

References

2015 racehorse births